List of pieces using polytonality and/or bitonality.

Samuel Barber
Symphony No. 2 (1944)
Béla Bartók
Mikrokosmos Volume 5 number 125: The opening (mm. 1-76) of  "Boating", (actually bimodality) in which the right hand uses pitches of E dorian and the left hand uses those of either G mixolydian or dorian
Mikrokosmos No. 105, "Playsong"
Bagatelles (1908) 1st Bagatelle, RH: C minor, LH: C Phrygian.
Jeff Beal
Theme from House of Cards
Heinrich Biber
Battalia à 10 (1673) 
Benjamin Britten
Sea Interludes (1945)
Fanfare for St Edmundsbury (1959)
Folk Songs of the British Isles, Vol. 1, No. 6
Vicente García
San Bá
Alberto Ginastera
Danzas Argentinas - 1. "Danza del viejo boyero" (1937), RH: white keys, LH: black keys
Philip Glass
Symphony No. 2, used for ambiguity
Jerry Goldsmith
Planet of the Apes (1968)
Patton (1970)
The Omen (1976)
Percy Grainger
Lincolnshire Posy
Gustav Holst
The Planets (Neptune)
Terzetto for Flute, Oboe and Viola
Arthur Honegger
Symphony for Strings, III
Bruce Hornsby
"What The Hell Happened" (from Halcyon Days, 2004)
Charles Ives
Variations on "America" (1891-1892), polytonal interludes added 1909-1910
Adeste fidelis for organ (1897)
Sixty-seventh Psalm (1898–99)
Piano Sonata No. 2 (Ives) III. The Alcotts, presence of bitonality (right hand in B major and left hand in A major)
Captain Beefheart
Frownland, from Trout Mask Replica (1969)
Hair Pie: Bake Two, from Trout Mask Replica (1969)
Petrified Forest, from Lick My Decals Off, Baby (1970)
Making Love to a Vampire with a Monkey on My Knee, from Doc At The Radar Station (1980)
John Kander
Cabaret (1966), in the Finale Ultimo
Colin McPhee
Concerto for Piano, with Wind Octette Acc. (1928)
Darius Milhaud
Scaramouche, in the first movement "Vif"
Sorocaba, from Saudades Do Brasil
Le Boeuf sur le toit
 (1920)
Ennio Morricone
The Untouchables (1987)
Wolfgang Amadeus Mozart
Ein musikalischer Spass

Sergei Prokofiev
Lieutenant Kijé Suite (mov. V, "The Burial of Kijé")
Sarcasms, Op. 17. The third movement uses two different key signatures for each hand.
Alfred Reed
A Festival Prelude
Julius Röntgen
Symphony No. 9 "The Bitonal" (Sept 8, 1930)
Arnold Schoenberg
"Gavotte", Suite for Piano Op. 25 (1923)
William Schuman
George Washington Bridge
Igor Stravinsky
Petrushka, opening fanfare
Symphony of Psalms - 3rd Movement
Symphonies of Wind Instruments (1947), rehearsal No. 11
"Rite of Spring"
Karol Szymanowski
String Quartet No. 1 in C major Movement 3 (1917). Each part has its own key: Cello, C; Viola, 3 flats; Violin 2, 6 sharps; Violin 1, 3 sharps. See score.
Jeff Wayne
The War of the Worlds - "The Red Weed (Parts 1 & 2)" (B and G major)

John Williams
Star Wars (1977)
Jaws (1975)
John Zdechlik
Chorale and Shaker Dance

Sources

Lists of musical works
Music theory lists